IDV or IdV may refer to:
 Indinavir, an antiretroviral drug
 Integrated Data Viewer, a software library
 Italy of Values (Italian: Italia dei Valori), a political party
 C.S.D. Independiente del Valle, a football club
 IDV, a successor company to Diageo
 Identity V, a 2018 video game
 International Distillers & Vintners, a former wine and spirits distribution company